Cornwall is a census-designated place (CDP) comprising the central village in the town of Cornwall, Litchfield County, Connecticut, United States. It is in the geographic center of the town, along Connecticut Route 4 (Furnace Brook Road/Cemetery Hill Road), southeast of West Cornwall and northeast of Cornwall Bridge.

Cornwall was first listed as a CDP prior to the 2020 census.

References 

Census-designated places in Litchfield County, Connecticut
Census-designated places in Connecticut